Nelufar Hedayat (born 1 January 1988) is a British journalist and presenter who hosts the podcast Course Correction and is the correspondent for Doha Debates. She has worked in television across the BBC, as well as on Channel 4, Netflix, Fusion and The Guardian newspaper, covering breaking news, live events and in-depth investigations in some of the world's most dangerous places. Her work often focuses on cultural upheaval experienced by women, children, and families during a conflict, especially in her native Afghanistan.

Background 
Born in Kabul, Afghanistan, in 1988, Hedayat came to the United Kingdom from her war-torn homeland. Her mother, who was a civil engineer, took a job cleaning hotel rooms, and her father, a professor of mathematics, worked as a carpet salesman. Hedayat has said: "Growing up in North London, identity was never really a big issue. I always felt I was free to be who I wanted to be, surrounded by a world where difference and eccentricity were the norm." She graduated from the University of Westminster with a BA Honours degree in English Literature.

Career
In December 2012, she appeared on the BBC television show Celebrity Mastermind, and came third, with Harry Potter as her specialist subject.

Hedayat joined BBC Three in 2009 and left in 2011 for BBC Newsround. In 2014 she left the BBC and worked as a general reporter for Channel 4 News. In 2015–16, she worked on the documentary series The Traffickers for Lightbox Media. She joined the Fusion Media investigative team in late 2016 and is now a full-time Fusion host.

In 2017 she was named Manchester Metropolitan University and Routes into Languages North West Journalist of the Year.

Women, Weddings, War and Me
The 2010 television documentary Women, Weddings, War and Me, directed by Ruhi Hamid, follows Hedayat as she returns to her homeland for the first time since leaving some 15 years earlier. She is presented as a typical British teenager, shopping, going out and spending time with her friends. Unlike most other 21-year-olds, however, Nel also has her history rooted in Afghanistan, where her parents were brought up and where most of her extended family currently live. She decided to return to Afghanistan to explore this part of her identity and discover how the lives of women in Afghanistan have changed with the fall of the Taliban. As she described it afterwards: "I met with women who had been so defeated by a patriarchal society, they thought of themselves as second-class citizens. I found a world of extreme violence against them, where they were traded like animals – not treated as human beings. Girls were in prison for trying to escape abusive marriages. I cried with these women, tried to understand them and to comfort them. ...I came back to the UK knowing that I had changed. I was humbled by my experience, but there was an ever stronger feeling of thankfulness to my mother, who had saved me from such suffering."

The documentary was shown on BBC Three from 2 March 2010. It also aired in Australia on ABC on 17 May 2010 and it has received largely positive reviews, while scoring the highest audience approval rating for a documentary on any channel ever reported. The documentary has gone on to win the Broadcast Digital Award for Best Current Affairs' Programme.

Music, Money and Hip Hop Honeys
In this BBC Three documentary aired in 2011, Hedayat explores the controversial world of hip-hop music video girls. She meets a host of young women in the UK hoping to "make it big" as hip-hop models both in the UK and the US.  However, alongside the glitz and glamour of the music video scene, Nel discovers a darker side to the industry where girls open themselves up to both financial and sexual exploitation.

Vietnam's Dog Snatchers 
In her 2014 début for Channel 4's Unreported World series, Hedayat went to uncover the secret world of the dog meat trade in Vietnam. Millions of dogs are killed every year to satisfy the demand for the meat. Often pets are stolen from homes because the demand is so high and police officers can do little but fine the thieves. Hedayat finds trucks crammed full of hundreds of dogs hungry and vomiting after being force-fed rice on the way to Hanoi's dog meat only restaurants and meets the village that murdered the thieves plaguing them. Hedayat worked on the film with director Daniel Bogado.

The Traffickers 
In her first 8-part documentary series, Hedayat takes a deep dive into the hidden world of traffickers and illicit markets around the world, uncovering vast criminal networks enabled by middle men and corruption. Visiting 32 countries worldwide, looking at pharmaceuticals, animal, miner; and human trafficking, Hedayat sets out to investigate with hidden cameras and connections the way these illegal markets make billions of dollars and how they connect to everyday life for ordinary people. For her work on the series, Hedayat in 2017 won the Reporter/Correspondent Gracie Award (presented by the Alliance for Women in Media), and also was named Journalist of the Year at the Asian Media Awards.

Television

References

External links
Women, Weddings, War and Me, BBC3 
Money and Hip Hop Honeys, BBC3 Music
The Truth about Child Brides, BBC3
Riots and Revolutions, BBC3
Nelufar's webpage, CBBC Newsround 
  BBC radio Nelufar's webpage
Channel 4 Unreported World 
Unreported World Channel 4, Channel 4 Reporter Profile, February 2015
Nelufar Hedayat, Noel Gay Agency, February 2015
The Traffickers, Lightbox Media, Netflix 2016
Food Exposed with Nelufar Hedayat, Fremantle Media 2018

1988 births
Living people
Afghan expatriates in the United Kingdom
Alumni of the University of Westminster
British women television journalists
British women television presenters
People from Kabul